The Chatham Maroons are a defunct Canadian semi-professional and amateur senior ice hockey team.  The team played in the City of Chatham, Ontario, Canada and participated in the International Hockey League on two occasions and the OHA Senior A Hockey League in between.

History
In 1950, the Chatham Maroons won the International Hockey League's Turner Cup as playoff champions by defeating the Sarnia Sailors 4-games-to-3.  This was the Maroons' only professional championship.

The Maroons later played in the Ontario Hockey Association (OHA) as a member of the OHA Senior A League. The team won the J. Ross Robertson Cup as league champions in 1956 and 1960, and were finalists in 1962 and 1963.

The Chatham Maroons were the winners of the 1960 Allan Cup, emblematic of the top senior hockey team in all of Canada. The same year the club played couple of friendlies in Moscow with the collective team of the Soviet clubs where they won the first meeting 5:3 and lost the second one 2:11. The Maroons defeated the Trail Smoke Eaters 4-games-to-none with one tie to clinch the championship.  The winner of the award earned the right, as the country's top amateur team, to compete for Canada at the Ice Hockey World Championships a season after winning.  The Maroons opted out and were replaced by Trail, who won the gold medal.

Season-by-season results

References

Defunct ice hockey teams in Canada
Ice hockey teams in Ontario
International Hockey League (1945–2001) teams
Senior ice hockey teams
Ice hockey clubs established in 1949
Sports clubs disestablished in 1964
1949 establishments in Ontario
1964 disestablishments in Ontario
Chatham-Kent